Osmanlı (formerly: Düğüz) is a village in the Gülağaç District, Aksaray Province, Turkey. Its population is 167 (2021). The village is populated by Kurds.

References

Villages in Gülağaç District
Kurdish settlements in Aksaray Province